Ilja Antonov (born 5 December 1992) is an Estonian professional footballer who plays as a midfielder for the Estonia national team and Levadia.

Club career

Puuma
Antonov came through the Puuma youth system. He played for Ararat and Kiviõli Tamme Auto, before making his debut for Puuma's first team in 2010.

Levadia
On 8 March 2012, Antonov signed a two-year contract Meistriliiga with Levadia. He made his debut in the Meistriliiga on 10 March 2012, in a 0–0 draw against Nõmme Kalju. Antonov scored three goals in 33 games as Levadia finished the 2012 season as runners up. He won two consecutive Meistriliiga titles in 2013 and 2014.

SV Horn
On 29 January 2017, Antonov joined Austrian Erste Liga club SV Horn on a contract until 2019. He was released by the club in May 2017, following their relegation in the 2016–17 season.

Rudar Velenje
On 14 July 2017, Antonov signed a two-year contract with PrvaLiga club Rudar Velenje. He made his debut in the PrvaLiga on 22 July 2017, in a 3–1 home victory over Ankaran Hrvatini.

Hermannstadt
On 21 June 2018, Antonov signed for Liga I club Hermannstadt on a two-year deal.

Ararat-Armenia
On 24 June 2019, Antonov signed for Ararat-Armenia. On 22 August 2019, he scored a winning goal against F91 Dudelange in Europa League play-off round. On July 14 2020 Antonov won the league title with Ararat-Armenia, becoming the first Estonian to win the Armenian league. 
He left the club in December 2020.

International career
Antonov began his youth career in 2012 with the Estonia under-21 team, making 15 appearances and scoring 2 goals.

On 1 November 2012, Antonov was called up by Tarmo Rüütli for a friendly against Oman on 8 November 2012, and made his senior international debut for Estonia in the 2–1 away victory. He scored his first goal for Estonia on 17 November 2015, in a 3–0 friendly victory over Saint Kitts and Nevis.

International goals
As of match played 10 October 2017. Estonia score listed first, score column indicates score after each Antonov goal.

Honours

Club
Levadia
Meistriliiga (2) : 2013, 2014
Estonian Cup (2) : 2011–12, 2013–14
Estonian Supercup (2) : 2013, 2015

Ararat-Armenia
 Armenian Premier League (1): 2019–20
Armenian Supercup (1): 2019

References

External links

1992 births
Living people
Footballers from Tallinn
Estonian men's futsal players
Estonian footballers
Estonian people of Russian descent
Association football midfielders
Esiliiga players
FC Kiviõli Irbis players
FC Puuma Tallinn players
Meistriliiga players
FCI Levadia Tallinn players
2. Liga (Austria) players
SV Horn players
Slovenian PrvaLiga players
NK Rudar Velenje players
Liga I players
FC Hermannstadt players
Armenian Premier League players
FC Ararat-Armenia players
Estonia under-21 international footballers
Estonia international footballers
Estonian expatriate footballers
Estonian expatriate sportspeople in Austria
Expatriate footballers in Austria
Estonian expatriate sportspeople in Slovenia
Expatriate footballers in Slovenia
Estonian expatriate sportspeople in Romania
Expatriate footballers in Romania
Expatriate footballers in Armenia
Estonian expatriate sportspeople in Armenia